Henryk Mandelbaum (December 15, 1922 – June 17, 2008) was a Polish Holocaust survivor. He was one of the prisoners in the Sonderkommando KL Auschwitz-Birkenau in the Auschwitz-Birkenau concentration camp who had to work in the crematory. Only 110 out of 2,000 prisoners survived the Sonderkommandos in Auschwitz-Birkenau, as of the death of Dario Gabbai in 2020, no former Auschwitz-Birkenau Sonderkommando are known to be alive. 

Mandelbaum was imprisoned as a Polish Jew at the age of 21 years. He fled from the Sosnowiec Ghetto and was reimprisoned on April 22, 1944, in Birkenau.

Auschwitz
After arriving to Auschwitz, Mandelbaum was designated to forced labour in the crematory. He had to carry the corpses of the people who were gassed with Zyklon B, check body orifices for valuables and break out dental gold. In 1944 the capacity of the crematoriums was too small to burn all the corpses of prisoners killed. Mandelbaum and others had to dig two huge pits, then burn the dead bodies in them. To improve the process they had to pour back the body fat, which was collected in small holes in the pit, over the top of the pile.

Mandelbaum participated in the rebellion of inmates on October 7, 1944, which was put down quickly by the SS. One Oberkapo and 3 members of the SS were killed in the revolt. Afterwards, 451 of the inmates were shot or hanged. This was the third rebellion in a camp after Treblinka (August 2, 1943) and Sobibor (October 14, 1943).

On a death march from Auschwitz to Loslau in January 1945, he was able to flee. He escaped wearing civilian clothes and hid on a farm for three weeks. After the liberation of Auschwitz he identified himself to the Wahrheitsfindungskommission (fact-finding commission) as an eyewitness.

Mandelbaum continued to live in Poland until his death and still carried the number 181970 on his left forearm. He often travelled to the former Nazi concentration camp of Auschwitz and to Germany to speak about his experiences. He said that young people especially should learn what happened in Auschwitz-Birkenau in 1945: "Man muss das doch alles wissen, man muss doch wissen, wie lange die Leute in den Gaskammern gewesen sind. Man muss wissen, wie lange sie gebrannt haben in den Öfen" ("People need to know, they really need to know, just how long the people were in the gas chambers. People need to know how long they burned in the ovens"). He sat as chair of the Auschwitz Museum directors and was keenly involved in publicising Auschwitz.

After the war, he was an officer of the Poviat Office for Public Security (UB) in Będzin in 1945-48.

He died on June 17, 2008, in the Polish city of Bytom, following heart surgery.

Films
Eric Friedler: Sklaven der Gaskammer - Das Jüdische Sonderkommando in Auschwitz, 2000, 44 min 
Stanislav Motl: Živý mrtvý - Live dead, 2008, 63 min

Books
 Sonder. An Interview with Sonderkommando Member Henryk Mandelbaum, Jan Południak, Oświęcim, 2008, .

References

External links
Hans G. Helms: Auschwitz vor Polens EU-Beitritt Junge Welt, 18. Mai 2001 
Jürgen Schön: Überleben nur von Tag zu Tag. taz, 20. Dezember 2004 
Ausstellung Bildungswerk Stanislav Hantz: NUR DIE STERNE WAREN WIE GESTERN Dreikönigskirche, Dresden, 16. März – 20. April 2006 
Sonderkommando.info. 

1922 births
2008 deaths
20th-century Polish Jews
Auschwitz concentration camp survivors
Sosnowiec Ghetto inmates
Sonderkommando
People from Olkusz